John Malois (born 1 February 1971) is a Canadian former cyclist. He competed in the men's point race at the 1992 Summer Olympics.

References

External links
 

1971 births
Living people
Canadian male cyclists
Olympic cyclists of Canada
Cyclists at the 1992 Summer Olympics
Sportspeople from Calgary
Cyclists from Alberta
20th-century Canadian people